Chal-e Anjireh (also Romanized as Chāl-e Ānjīreh; also known as Chāl-e Ānjīr) is a village in Lalar and Katak Rural District, Chelo District, Andika County, Khuzestan Province, Iran. At the 2006 census, its population was 91, in 13 families.

References 

Populated places in Andika County